Arman (1928–2005) was a French-American artist.

Arman may also refer to:

Arman (name)

Places
Arman, Nepal, a village in the Dhaulagiri Zone of Nepal
Arman, Russia, a rural locality (a settlement) in Magadan Oblast, Russia
Arman (river), a river in Russia
Arman (Crișul Negru), a river in Romania
Arman, the Romanian name of Kardam, Dobrich Province, Bulgaria
Armān, alternative name of Armand-e Olya, a village in Chaharmahal and Bakhtiari Province of Iran

Other
Archaeal Richmond Mine acidophilic nanoorganisms (ARMAN), the archaeal phylum
Arman (cinema), in Almaty, Kazakhstan
Arman FM, an entertainment commercial radio station in Afghanistan
FC Arman, a defunct Kazakhstani association football team
Arman oil field, an oil field in Kazakhstan
Arman Monthly, Australian monthly publication serving the Afghani community

See also
Ahriman (disambiguation)
Arimanius
Armaan (disambiguation)
Armand (disambiguation)
Armani (disambiguation)

Turkish-language surnames